Merritt James Norvell III (born March 28, 1963) is an American college football coach and former player. He is the head football coach at Colorado State University, a position he has held since the 2022 season. Norvell served as the head football coach at the University of Nevada, Reno from 2017 to 2021. His father, Merritt Norvell, was the athletic director at Michigan State University from 1995 to 1998.

Playing career
Norvell played college football at the University of Iowa from 1982 to 1985 and professionally in the National Football League (NFL) as a linebacker with the Chicago Bears for one season, in 1987.

Coaching career

Early coaching career
His coaching career began at his alma mater Iowa in 1986 when Norvell took a job as a graduate assistant. From 1988 to 2001, Norvell served as an assistant coach for multiple positions at Northern Iowa, Wisconsin, and Iowa State. Norvell briefly spent time in the NFL as an assistant coach from 2002 to 2006 with the Indianapolis Colts and Oakland Raiders before returning to college football at the University of Nebraska to take his first ever offensive coordinator job in 2004. At Nebraska, he helped guide quarterback Zac Taylor to win Big 12 Offensive Player of the Year honors and break several school passing records.

Norvell spent a season as the offensive coordinator at UCLA in 2007, and then served as the assistant offensive coordinator and wide receivers coach at Oklahoma from 2008 to 2010 before being promoted to co-offensive coordinator and wide receivers coach in 2011. Norvell remained at Oklahoma until 2015, when he was hired as the wide receivers coach at the University of Texas, where he held play calling duties. Norvell then spent the 2016 season as the wide receivers coach and passing game coordinator at Arizona State before landing his first head coaching job with Nevada in 2017.

Nevada
In 2017, Norvell was named head coach for the Nevada football program. The team struggled during Norvell's first year, going 3–9 in 2017. However, Norvell helped the team rebound the next season, with Nevada going 8–5 in 2018, including a 16–13 overtime victory in the 2018 Arizona Bowl over Arkansas State. Nevada posted winning records in 2019, 2020, and 2021 as well, and Norvell finished his tenure at Nevada recording a winning record in four of his five seasons. Norvell also led Nevada quarterback Carson Strong to back-to-back Mountain West Conference Offensive Player of the Year awards in 2020 and 2021.

Colorado State
On December 6, 2021, Colorado State hired Norvell to be their 24th head coach and first Black head coach in program history. Norvell's explosive, pass-heavy offensive style came as a stark contrast to previous head coach Steve Addazio's run-heavy smashmouth offense.

Head coaching record

†=The team was coached by interim head coach Vai Taua for the 2021 Quick Lane Bowl as Norvell left the program prior to the game.

References

External links
 Colorado State profile
 Nevada profile
 Arizona State profile
 Texas profile
 UCLA profile
 Nebraska profile

1963 births
Living people
American football defensive backs
American football linebackers
Arizona State Sun Devils football coaches
Chicago Bears players
Colorado State Rams football coaches
Indianapolis Colts coaches
Iowa Hawkeyes football coaches
Iowa Hawkeyes football players
Iowa State Cyclones football coaches
National Football League replacement players
Nebraska Cornhuskers football coaches
Nevada Wolf Pack football coaches
Northern Iowa Panthers football coaches
Oakland Raiders coaches
Oklahoma Sooners football coaches
Texas Longhorns football coaches
UCLA Bruins football coaches
Wisconsin Badgers football coaches
Sportspeople from Madison, Wisconsin
Coaches of American football from Wisconsin
Players of American football from Wisconsin
African-American coaches of American football
African-American players of American football
20th-century African-American sportspeople
21st-century African-American sportspeople